The Tessa Youngblood House is a historic building located in Mason City, Iowa, United States.  Completed in 1922, the house is attributed to local contractor John Taylor.  The two-story structure features a stuccoed exterior above a brick base, and a heavy roof design with a deep fascia. The attached garage in the back was converted into a room in 1958, and at the same time the second story room above it was added. A detached garage was built the same year. The house was listed on the National Register of Historic Places in 1980. In 2015 the house and the garage were included as contributing properties in the Forest Park Historic District.

References

Houses completed in 1922
Prairie School architecture in Iowa
Houses in Mason City, Iowa
National Register of Historic Places in Mason City, Iowa
Houses on the National Register of Historic Places in Iowa
Individually listed contributing properties to historic districts on the National Register in Iowa